Mary Texas Hurt Garner (October 3, 1928 – July 1, 1997) was a politician from Alabama. She served as Alabama State Treasurer from 1963 to 1967, State Auditor of Alabama from 1959 to 1963 and Secretary of State of Alabama from 1955 to 1959.

She received a degree from George Washington University and was admitted to the Alabama Bar Association by examination and practiced law one year in Scottsboro before becoming a member of the state Attorney General's office. She resigned this position to become a candidate for the office of Secretary of State in 1954 and was elected State Auditor in 1958 and State Treasurer in 1962.

According to the Centreville Press (Centreville, AL): "Before entering law school, Miss Hurt was the Manager for the Bocanita Theatre in Scottsboro and at the age of 12 was credited with being the 'world's youngest theatre manager.'"

She married William E. Garner on November 3, 1956, and had two children. She died on July 1, 1997.

References

1928 births
1997 deaths
Women state constitutional officers of Alabama
People from Scottsboro, Alabama
Alabama Democrats
George Washington University alumni
State treasurers of Alabama
State Auditors of Alabama
Secretaries of State of Alabama